Leonard Makhanya (born 9 August 1964) is a former Swaziland boxer. Makhanya competed at the 1984 Summer Olympics, where he was defeated by Pat Clinton of Great Britain in his first round match. He won a bronze medal at the 1982 Commonwealth Games as a light-flyweight and won a silver medal at the 1986 Commonwealth Games as a flyweight.

References

1964 births
Living people
Swazi male boxers
Light-flyweight boxers
Flyweight boxers
Olympic boxers of Eswatini
Boxers at the 1984 Summer Olympics
Commonwealth Games bronze medallists for Eswatini
Commonwealth Games silver medallists for Eswatini
Boxers at the 1982 Commonwealth Games
Boxers at the 1986 Commonwealth Games
Place of birth missing (living people)
Commonwealth Games medallists in boxing
Medallists at the 1982 Commonwealth Games
Medallists at the 1986 Commonwealth Games